Upsilon Cygni, Latinized from υ Cygni, is a star in the northern constellation of Cygnus. It is visible to the naked eye, having an apparent visual magnitude of 4.43.

This is a B-type main sequence star with a stellar classification of B2 Vne. The 'e' suffix indicates this is a Be star, which means it is a rapidly rotating star surrounded by an orbiting gaseous disk. It has a high projected rotational velocity of about 230 km/s, which accounts for the nebulous appearance of its lines as indicated by the 'n' suffix. The star itself is being viewed generally "pole-on", as ascertained by the lack of absorption features from the disk.

Upsilon Cygni holds 9.3 times the mass of the Sun and is 4.7 times the Sun's radius. The rapid rotation is giving the star an oblate shape with an equatorial bulge that is 18% wider than the polar radius. It is radiating 7,305 times the solar luminosity from its outer atmosphere at an effective temperature of 22,000 K.

The star shows variations in luminosity, including short term non-radial pulsations with periods of 2.95 and 2.6 per day, as well as random outbursts occurring up to every few years. The latter may be associated with mass-loss episodes. There is suspicion this is a spectroscopic binary, but no companion has been detected via speckle interferometry. Measured variations in radial velocity may be caused by a companion having an orbital period of about 11.4 years. Several stars appear close to it in the sky, but they are likely optical companions.

References

B-type main-sequence stars
Be stars
Cygnus (constellation)
Cygni, Upsilon
Cygni, 66
Durchmusterung objects
202904
105138
8146